Richard Taurer is an American former paralympic weightlifter. He competed at the 1976 Summer Paralympics, winning the bronze medal in the men's middleweight weightlifting event. He also competed in the men's discus throw 3 event, finishing 10th.

References

External links 

Living people
Place of birth missing (living people)
Year of birth missing (living people)
Weightlifters at the 1976 Summer Paralympics
Athletes (track and field) at the 1976 Summer Paralympics
Medalists at the 1976 Summer Paralympics
Paralympic medalists in weightlifting
Paralympic bronze medalists for the United States
American male discus throwers
Paralympic discus throwers
Wheelchair discus throwers